Marc-Patrick Meister (born 23 July 1980) is a German football manager who manages Germany U16. He previously managed Karlsruher SC.

References

External links
 

1980 births
Living people
People from Bruchsal
Sportspeople from Karlsruhe (region)
German football managers
2. Bundesliga managers
3. Liga managers
Karlsruher SC managers